The 2004 AFL Women's National Championships took place in Adelaide, South Australia, Australia. The tournament began on 19 June and ended on 24 June 2004. The 2004 tournament was the 13th Championship. The Senior-vics of Victoria won the 2004 Championship, defeating the U19-vics of Victoria in the final. It was Victoria's 13th consecutive title.

Ladder
 
 
 
 
 
 
 
 Australian Defence Force

All-Australian Team

External links
National Results from the AFL site

2004
2004 in Australian rules football
AFL